Alor may refer to:

South Asia 
Aror or Alor, medieval name of city of Sukkur, Sindh, Pakistan
Chach of Alor, Brahmin Chamberlain and Secretary to Rai Sahasi the Second
Alor, Bastar, a village in Bastar district, Chhattisgarh, India

Southeast Asia 
Alor Archipelago, Indonesia
Alor Island, Indonesia
Alor Strait, Indonesia
Alor Regency, Indonesia
Alor–Pantar languages, a group of non-Austronesian languages
Alorese, an Austronesian language spoken on Alor Island
Alor Setar, a city in Malaysia
Menara Alor Setar, a tower in Alor Setar
Alor Gajah, a town and a district in Melaka, Malaysia
Lebuh AMJ or the Alor Gajah Bypass
Alor Gajah British Graveyard

Other 
Alor, Nigeria
Alőr, the Hungarian name for Urişor village, Cășeiu Commune, Cluj County, Romania
Australian League of Rights

See also 
 Aloor (disambiguation)